Sabbahi (also Romanized as Şabbāḩī; also known as Sabbāhīyeh) is a village in Soltanabad Rural District, in the Central District of Ramhormoz County, Khuzestan Province, Iran. At the 2006 census, its population was 231, in 47 families.

References 

Populated places in Ramhormoz County